Cyréna Samba-Mayela (born 31 October 2000) is a French athlete who competes in the 60 metres hurdles and 100 metres hurdles. She won the gold medal in the 60 m hurdles at the 2022 World Indoor Championships, with the current French national record of 7.78 seconds.

Samba-Mayela holds European under-18 bests in the 60 m and 100 m hurdles (76.2 cm). She won silver medals for the 100 m hurdles at the 2017 World U18 Championships and 2021 European U23 Championships.

Career

Junior career
Samba-Mayela won the gold medal in the medley relay at the 2016 European Youth Athletics Championships, running the 100 metres leg in Tbilisi.

In 2017, she was the World U18 Championship 100 m hurdles silver medallist in Nairobi.

2020–present
She was crowned French senior champion in the 60 m hurdles indoors in 2020 in Liévin. On 12 September that year, she won the French outdoor championship at the Stadium Municipal, Albi, running the 100 m hurdles in a time of 12.73, the fastest ever time by a European teenager, and the eighth-fastest French woman ever. In 2020 it was the fourth-fastest time by a woman in the world. Shortly prior to this, she had claimed victories over quality international line-ups in Chorzów and Marseille.

In Madrid on June 19, 2021, Samba-Mayela took victory in 12.80 seconds in the 100 m hurdles to meet the Olympic minimum standard for the delayed 2020 Tokyo Olympics. Unfortunately an injury in the warm up pre-race prevented her Olympic debut.

In 2022, she won the gold medal for the 60 m hurdles at the World Indoor Championships held in Belgrade, Serbia, setting a French national record of 7.78 seconds. Devynne Charlton took silver in 7.81 s while the third-placed Gabbi Cunningham clocked 7.87 s.

Achievements

International competitions

National titles
 French Athletics Championships
 100 m hurdles: 2020, 2021
 French Indoor Athletics Championships
 60 m hurdles: 2020

Personal life
Born in France, Samba-Mayela is of Congolese descent.

References

External links
 

2000 births
Living people
French female hurdlers
People from Champigny-sur-Marne
Black French sportspeople
French sportspeople of Democratic Republic of the Congo descent
World Athletics Indoor Championships winners